Orbital Education was founded in 2005 by Kevin McNeany. The company runs a group of schools and colleges offering British education which is owned and managed from Cheadle Hulme in Cheshire, United Kingdom. The company has established schools in the UK and worldwide.

Member schools
Baleares International College, Spain
Britannica International School Budapest
Britannica International School Shanghai
British International School of Ljubljana
The British School of Quito
Oryx International School Doha
United School International, The Pearl in Doha, Qatar

Awards and achievements
In 2017, Orbital Education was recognised by the London Stock Exchange Group as one of the 1,000 Companies to Inspire Britain consecutively for two years. By 2018, the education company was included in the Sunday Times HSBC International Track 200 for fastest-growing international sales, measured over the company's latest two years of available accounts. 2019 saw Orbital Education recognised at position 35 in the BDO Sunday Times Profit Track 100 list and then honoured with the Queen's Award for Enterprise: International Trade for its excellence in international trade.

References 

Private and independent school organizations
Private school organisations in the United Kingdom
Education companies of the United Kingdom
2005 establishments in England